John Pinckney may refer to:
 John M. Pinckney (1845–1905), U.S. Representative from Texas
 John A. Pinckney (1905–1972), American prelate of the Episcopal Church